Eduardus Ludovicus Baron van Voorst tot Voorst (17 November 1874 – 2 April 1945) was a Dutch sport shooter who competed at the 1908 Summer Olympics and the 1920 Summer Olympics.

He was born in Bagoe, Kraksaän, Probolinggo, Dutch East Indies and died in Warnsveld. He was the older brother of Franciscus van Voorst tot Voorst.

In 1908 he finished fourth with the Dutch team in the team trap shooting event. In the individual trap competition he finished 15th. Twelve years later he finished sixth as a member of the Dutch team in the team clay pigeons event.

References

External links
list of Dutch shooters

1874 births
1945 deaths
Dutch male sport shooters
Olympic shooters of the Netherlands
Shooters at the 1908 Summer Olympics
Shooters at the 1920 Summer Olympics
Trap and double trap shooters
Barons of Voorst tot Voorst
People from Probolinggo
Dutch people of the Dutch East Indies